Eric Marienthal (born December 19, 1957) is a Grammy Award-nominated Los Angeles-based contemporary saxophonist best known for his work in the jazz, jazz fusion, smooth jazz, and pop genres.

Early life
Eric Marienthal was born on December 19, 1957 in Sacramento, California to Robert Marienthal, an insurance salesman, but moved to San Mateo when he was two years old. He has credited his enthusiasm for music on being taught music while in school, and picked up the saxophone in the fourth grade after he thought it looked "pretty cool". Marienthal has also mentioned his father was a fan of music, particularly 1940s and 1950s such as Boots Randolph, Nat King Cole and Frank Sinatra. He initially wanted to pick up the trumpet but a teacher discouraged him because of his braces. As Marienthal progressed, his father bought him a $400 Selmer saxophone and enrolled him in Corona Del Mar High School. Throughout his education, Marienthal also learned to play guitar (in grade school), flute, clarinet (both high school) and piano (college).

After graduating from high school in Southern California in 1976, he studied at the Berklee College of Music, where he studied with the saxophone professor, Joe Viola. By the time he left Berklee, Eric had achieved the highest proficiency rating given by the school.

Career

Marienthal started his professional career in 1980 with famed New Orleans trumpeter Al Hirt. After returning to Los Angeles, Eric became a member of the Chick Corea Elektric Band. Marienthal has stated that he was a Chick Corea fan even before he started performing with him. He recorded six albums with that band and two of them won Grammy Awards.

Marienthal has also written instructional books, including Comprehensive Jazz Studies & Exercises, The Ultimate Jazz Play Along, and The Music of Eric Marienthal and instructional videos, including Play Sax From Day One, Modern Sax and Tricks of the Trade, all published by Warner Brothers Publications, which is now Alfred Publishing/Belwin Jazz.
Every summer since 1999, he has put on an annual fundraising concert for High Hopes Head Injury Program, a non-profit organization in Orange County, California that works with people who have suffered traumatic head injuries.

Marienthal occupies the lead alto chair of Gordon Goodwin's Big Phat Band, playing alto saxophone, soprano saxophone, flute, and piccolo.

In 2012, Marienthal released the album It's Love, produced by guitarist Chuck Loeb, who also appears on the tracks. The studio band includes keyboardist Russell Ferrante, drummer Gary Novak, and bassist Tim Lefebvre.

Equipment
 Selmer Mark VI Alto Saxophone with a  "Eric Marienthal Special" mouthpiece with a size 7 (.085 inch) tip opening and ishimori woodstone  ligature
 Yamaha Custom Z Alto Saxophone with a Beechler Metal No. 7 mouthpiece and 'Olegature' ligature
 Selmer Mark VI Tenor Saxophone with a Berg Larsen Metal 100/2 mouthpiece and Brancher ligature
 Yamaha YSS 62 Soprano Saxophone with a Selmer Super Session #H mouthpiece and Harrison ligature
Muramatsu Flute
 Vandoren traditional 2.5 reeds

Discography
 1988: Voices of the Heart (GRP)
 1989: Round Trip (GRP)
 1990: Crossroads (GRP)
 1991: Oasis (GRP)
 1993: One Touch (GRP)
 1994: Street Dance (GRP)
 1997: Easy Street (PolyGram/Verve)
 1997: Collection (GRP)
 1998: Walk Tall (Verve)
 2001: Turn Up the Heat (Peak)
 2003: Sweet Talk (Peak)
 2005: Got You Covered (Peak)
 2007: Just Around the Corner (Peak)
 2012: It's Love (Peak/Entertainment One)
 2015: Bridges with Chuck Loeb (Shanachie)
 2020: Double Dealin' (with Randy Brecker, Shanachie Records)

References

External links 
~
 Alabama Jazz Hall of Fame Official Website, jazzhall.com; accessed March 9, 2015.

1957 births
American jazz saxophonists
American male saxophonists
Smooth jazz saxophonists
People from San Mateo, California
GRP Records artists
Living people
Musicians from Sacramento, California
Musicians from the San Francisco Bay Area
Berklee College of Music alumni
The Rippingtons members
21st-century American saxophonists
Jazz musicians from California
21st-century American male musicians
American male jazz musicians
Gordon Goodwin's Big Phat Band members
Chick Corea Elektric Band members
GRP All-Star Big Band members